Sofeyreh (also Romanized as Şofeyreh; also known as Safareh and Safera) is a village in Mosharrahat Rural District, in the Central District of Ahvaz County, Khuzestan Province, Iran. At the 2006 census, its population was 311, in 59 families.

References 

Populated places in Ahvaz County